Xiang Wenjun (born 5 February 1997) is a Chinese footballer who plays for China League One side Guangdong South China Tiger.

Club career
Xiang Wenjun started his professional football career in August 2016 when he was loaned to Hong Kong Premier League side R&F, which was the satellite team of Guangzhou R&F. He made his senior league debut on 1 November 2016 in a 2–0 home defeat against South China.

Career statistics
Statistics accurate as of match played 6 May 2017.

1League Cups include Hong Kong Senior Challenge Shield, Hong Kong League Cup and Hong Kong Sapling Cup.

References

1997 births
Living people
Association football defenders
Chinese footballers
R&F (Hong Kong) players
Footballers from Guangzhou
Hong Kong Premier League players
21st-century Chinese people